Richard Osbert Lumley, 13th Earl of Scarbrough  (born 18 May 1973), known as Viscount Lumley until 2004, is a British peer and landowner.

The elder son of Richard Lumley, 12th Earl of Scarbrough, and his wife Lady Elizabeth, Lumley was educated at Eton College and was a Page of Honour to Queen Elizabeth The Queen Mother from 1 March 1989 to 1 January 1991. He succeeded his father in 2004. In 2007, he married Henrietta Elfrida Helen Boyson.
Scarbrough was appointed a Deputy Lord Lieutenant of South Yorkshire on 11 April 2011. 

He lives at Sandbeck Park, near Maltby, South Yorkshire, and takes an active part in local charities, including serving as Patron of the Sheffield Royal Society for the Blind. The Sandbeck Park estate was reported in 2007 to cover about 5,000 acres. The house is near Maltby Colliery, a large deep coal mine which closed in 2013.

Scarbrough also owns the former family seat of Lumley Castle, which is now a hotel and restaurant. In 2013, it had 73 bedrooms.

References

1973 births
Living people
Deputy Lieutenants of South Yorkshire
People educated at Eton College
Earls of Scarbrough